Makád is a village in the county of Pest, Hungary, near Hungary's capital Budapest.

Twin towns - twin cities
  Umbria – Italy
  Sighișoara – Romania

Halasztelek